There are various Black Lakes in Nova Scotia, Canada. They vary widely in size, depth and usability. Many counties, such as Cumberland, Halifax, Inverness, and Pictou Counties have more than one Black Lake so named, while other counties mentioned in this article have only one named Black Lake.

Colchester County

There a Black Lake in Colchester County, Nova Scotia south of the collector road 256 and north of the Highway 104 near Clear Lake. It is located at:

Cumberland County

There are two Black Lakes in Cumberland County, Nova Scotia.

Fish include brown trout, white perch and smallmouth bass.
The lake is surrounded by nutrient poor coniferous forest dominated by black spruce canopy, with high shrub and sphagnum moss cover.
As of 2005 there was a woodlot near the lake with about 200 specimens of the economically valuable Northern White Cedar.

This is the deepest lake in the province, with a depth of 

As of 2010 about 200 eastern white cedars were present near the lake in a mixedwood and old field environment, with the oldest tree 148 years of age.

Guysborough County

The Black Lake in Guysborough County, Nova Scotia is just west of the junction of collector road 316 with Old Country Harbour Road and Hendsbee Road. And north east of Eight Island Lake. It is located at:

Halifax Regional Municipality

There are five Black Lakes in Halifax Regional Municipality.
In an attempt to improve the water quality of this black lake,  of basic slag was added to the lake in 1948, plus  of superphosphate.

Inverness County

Black Lakes is a pair of lakes on Cape Breton Island in Inverness County, in north-western Nova Scotia, Canada that flow via MacIntyres Brook into Bras d'Or Lake.  It is located at:

Lunenburg County

The Black Lake in Lunenburg County, Nova Scotia is west of the collector road 208 and Zwicker Falls by about 6 kilometers. The closest community is New Germany which is farther to the east. The lake is located at:

Pictou County

There are four Black Lakes in Pictou County, Nova Scotia.
The lake is drained by the East River, Pictou, which flows into the Northumberland Strait. It is surrounded by forestry land. Chain pickerel, which is not a native species in Nova Scotia, was illegally introduced around 1998.
The lake used to have a good population of speckled trout, and several other species, but since the pickerel were introduced the trout, perch and minnows have no longer been found.
The lake is open for winter fishing of chain pickerel by holders of a general fishing license.  In 2006 the season was 1 January to 31 March, with a bag limit of 25 fish per day.
The same dates and bag limit applied in 2011.
On 19–20 February 2011 the ministry threw the lake open to fishers who did not have a license.
In 2012 the lake was open all year for chain pickerel fishing.

Queens County

Victoria County

Yarmouth County

The Black Lake in Yarmouth County, Nova Scotia is about 27 kilometers south west of Lake Rossignol and it is the third lake just west of the collector road 203. About equidistance to the south along 203 is the town of Shelburne within Shelburne County. The lake is located at:

Complete list
Coordinates of all the Black Lakes are:

See also

List of lakes in Nova Scotia

References

Lakes of Nova Scotia
Lakes, Black Lake